Samuel Rutherford (also Rutherfurd or Rutherfoord;  – 29 March 1661) was a Scottish Presbyterian pastor and theologian who wrote widely read letters, sermons, devotional and scholastic works. As a political theorist, he is known for "Lex, Rex: the Law and the Prince," a defense of constitutionalism and limited government against the supposed divine right of kings, and other works advocating separation of church and state and a divine right of presbyters (elders). He was one of the Scottish Commissioners to the Westminster Assembly.

Life

Samuel Rutherford was born in the parish of Nisbet (now part of Crailing), Roxburghshire, in the Scottish Borders, about 1600. Nothing certain is known as to his parentage, but he belonged to the same line as the Roxburghs of Hunthill (from whom Sir Walter Scott was descended) and his father is believed to have been a farmer or miller. A brother was school-master of Kirkcudbright, and was a Bible Reader there, and another brother was an officer in the Dutch army.

Rutherford was educated at Jedburgh Grammar School and the University of Edinburgh. After graduating with an M.A. in 1621, he was appointed regent of Humanity at Edinburgh in 1623. He demitted that office in 1626, because of immoral conduct with Euphame Hamilton, who afterwards became his wife. He was admitted to Anwoth Kirkcudbrightshire, Galloway in 1627, probably without Episcopal sanction. It was said of him there that "he was always praying, always preaching, always visiting the sick, always catechising, always writing and studying". One of his patrons in Galloway was John Gordon, 1st Viscount of Kenmure who died in 1644. His wife, Jane Gordon, Viscountess Kenmure, was a regular correspendent and a continuing supporter of him and his work.

In 1630 he was summoned before the Court of High Commission, but the charge of non-conformity was not persisted in. Mainly for his publication of a work against Arminianism he was again accused in 1636 by Bishop Sydserff, and after proceedings at Wigtown, was cited before the Commission and prohibited, 27 July, from exercising ministerial office, and ordered to reside in Aberdeen during the King's pleasure. During this period he wrote most of his well-known Letters. His writing desk there was said to be, "perhaps the most effective and widely resounding pulpit then in old Christendom."

In February 1638 Rutherford returned to Anwoth and attended the Glasgow Assembly that year as one of two commissioners from his Presbytery. Shortly afterwards he was elected one of the ministers of Edinburgh, but the Commission of Assembly appointed him, in preference, Professor of Divinity at St Andrews, which office he only accepted on condition that he should be allowed to act as colleague with Robert Blair, one of the ministers of St Andrews, 7 January 1639. He was a member of succeeding Assemblies and consistently supported the Covenanting Party therein. In 1643 he was appointed one of the four main Commissioners of the Church of Scotland to the Westminster Assembly and preached several times before Parliament, remaining in London for four years.

Rutherford was appointed to Principalship of St Mary's College in St Andrews (later merging to become St Andrews University) in 1647 in place of Robert Howie. He was offered in 1648 a Divinity Professorship at Harderwyck in Holland, in 1649 the chair at Edinburgh, and in 1651 he was twice elected to a Professorship at Utrecht, but all these he declined. In 1643, 1644, 1650, and 1651 he was elected rector of the university, and in 1650 on Charles II.'s visit to St Andrews, he made a Latin speech to him on the duty of Kings. Rutherford was a staunch Protester during the controversy in the Scottish Presbyterian church between the Resolutioners and Protesters in the 1650s.

After the Restoration he was one of the first marked out for persecution: his work Lex Rex was ordered by the Committee of Estates to be burnt at the Crosses of Edinburgh and St Andrews by the hand of the common hangman, while the "Drunken Parliament" deprived him of all his offices and voted that he not be permitted to die in the college. He was cited to appear before Parliament on a charge of treason, but he died 29 March 1661 [the date — 20th — on his tombstone is an error]. He is buried in the churchyard of St Andrews Cathedral just west of the bell tower. The epitaph on his tombstone includes 'Acquainted with Emmanuel's Love'.

Legacy

One of the classical figures of the Church of Scotland, Rutherford's influence during his lifetime, as scholar, preacher, and writer, was profound and wide, and after his death his name received a popular canonisation which it retains to this day. Some forty editions of his Letters have been reprinted (Bonar's edition contains 365), and innumerable anecdotes of his sayings and doings are enshrined in, and constitute no inconsiderable part of the Scottish tradition. Among his last words were: "Glory shines in Immanuel's Land," on which Mrs Anne Boss Cousin founded her hymn, "The Sands of Time are sinking."

There is also a monument to Rutherford, a Category B listed granite obelisk erected in 1842 on the hilltop overlooking his former parish at Anwoth, in the village of Gatehouse of Fleet, southwest Scotland.

Family
He married firstly in 1626, Euphame Hamilton, who died June 1630, and had issue — Marie, baptised 14 April 1628. He later married again on 24 March 1640, Jean M'Math, who was buried in Greyfriars Churchyard on 15 May 1675, and had issue — Agnes (married William Chiesley, W.S.), died 29 July 1694, and six others who predeceased him. He is known to have been friendly with James Guthrie.

Writings
Charles Haddon Spurgeon described Rutherford's letters to be the nearest thing to inspiration which can be found in all the writings of mere men, continuing in an 1891 review of Rutherford's  posthumously published Letters (1664) 'when we are dead and gone let the world know that Spurgeon held Rutherford's Letters to be the nearest thing to inspiration which can be found in all the writings of mere men'. Andrew Thomson, a Scottish minister, in a 19th-century biography observed "the letters flash upon the reader with original thoughts and abound in lofty feeling clothed in the radiant garb of imagination in which there is everything of poetry but the form." He continues describing: "individual sentences that supplied the germ-thought of some of the most beautiful spiritual in modern poetry". Elsewhere he talks of "a bundle of myrrh  whose ointment and perfume would revive and gladden the hearts of many generations". He also quotes that "each letter, full of hope and yet of heartbreak, full of tender pathos of the here and the hereafter.'  Rutherford was also known for other spiritual and devotional works, such as Christ Dying and drawing Sinners to Himself, "The Trial and Triumph of Faith".

Rutherford's political book Lex, Rex, or The Law and the Prince (1644) was written in response to John Maxwell's Sacro-Sanctum Regus Majestas (1644). It justified defensive wars and presented a theory of limited government and constitutionalism.  It raised Rutherford to eminence as a philosophical thinker.  After the Restoration, the authorities burned Lex, Rex and cited Rutherford for high treason, but his death intervened before the charge could be tried.  Rutherford was vehemently opposed to liberty of conscience and his A Free Disputation against Pretended Liberty of Conscience (1649) has been described as "perhaps the ablest defence of persecution ever to appear in a protestant nation" and "the ablest defence of persecution during the seventeenth century."  It raised the ire of John Milton, who named Rutherford in his sonnet on the forcers of conscience in the Long Parliament.  Rutherford also was a strong supporter of the divine right of Presbyterianism (the idea that the Presbyterian form of church government is mandated in the Bible), and was involved in written controversies over church government with the New England Independents (or Congregationalists).  His A Peaceable Plea for Paul's Presbytery in Scotland (1642) was followed by his Due Right of Presbyteries (1644), Divine Right of Church Government and Excommunication (1648) and A Survey of "A Survey of that Sum of Church Discipline" penned by Thomas Hooker (1655), with not only Hooker but also John Cotton and Richard Mather writing books against Rutherford's view of church government.

List of works
 Exercitationes pro Divina Gratia Amsterdam 1636
 A Peaceable and Temperate Plea for Paul's Presbytery in Scotland London 1642
 A Sermon before the House of Commons, on Daniel, London 1644
 The Due Right of Presbyteries London 1644
 Lex Rex, or The Law and the Prince London 1644
 A Sermon before the House of Lords on Luke 7:22 London 1645
 The Trial and Triumph of Faith London 1645
 The Divine Right Of Church Government and Excommunication London 1646
 Christ Dying and Drawing Sinners to Himself London 1647
 A Survey of the Spiritual Antichrist London 1648
 A Free Disputation against Pretended Liberty of Conscience London 1649
 The Last and Heavenly Speech and Glorious Departure of John, Viscount Kenmure  Edinburgh 1649
 Disputatio Scholastica de Divina Providentia Edinburgh 1649
 The Covenant of Life Opened Edinburgh 1655
 A Survey of 'The Survey of that Sum of Church Discipline' penned by Mr. Thomas Hooker London 1658
 Influences of the Life of Grace London 1659
 Joshua Redivivus, or  Mr Rutherford's Letters 1664
 Examen Arminianismi Utrecht 1668
 A Testimony left by Mr. S. Rutherford to the Work of Reformation uncertain date
 A Treatise on Prayer  1713
 The Cruel Watchman, The Door of Salvation Opened Edinburgh 1735
 Twelve Communion Sermons Glasgow 1876
 Quaint Sermons Hodder & Stoughton, London 1885
 Rutherford’s Catechism: Containing the Sum of Christian Religion.  London, 1886 
 A discussing of some arguments against Cannons and ceremonies in God’s worship in David G. Mullan (ed.) Religious Controversy in Scotland 1625–1639.  (Edinburgh: Scottish Historical Society, 1998), pp. 82–99
Initially sourced from Andrew Bonar's Letters of Samuel Rutherford, with updates and corrections.

Bibliography
Hew Scott's:
Gilmour's Samuel Rutherford (portrait), Edinburgh, 1904
Cat. Edinburgh University Library, iii. 426
Whyte's Samuel Rutherford and some of his Correspondents
Murray's Life and Literary History of Galloway, 76-95 
St Giles' Lectures, 3rd ser., 73-108 (Edinburgh, 1883; 
Life, by Andrew Thomson, D.D. 
Andrew A. Bonars edition of the Letters 
Philip's The Devotional Literature of Scotland, 116-25 (London, 1925); 
St Andrews Tests.

See also
Covenanters
Andrew Bonar who edited Rutherford's Letters for publication in 1863
George Gillespie
Alexander Henderson
Robert Baillie
Rutherford Institute, a conservative civil-liberties organization named for Rutherford

References

Sources

 

.
.

Attribution

Further reading
 
 Coffey, John, Politics, Religion and the British Revolutions: The Mind of Samuel Rutherford, (1997),

External links

 
 A short biography and selected writings
 
 
 .
 .
 
 
 .
 .
 Christ Above All, a collection of works by and about Rutherford and other Second Reformation leaders
 Letters of Samuel Rutherford (Joshua Redivivus), in its entirety (free PDF download)
 Lex, Rex, in its entirety (free PDF download)
 The Last and Heavenly Speeches, and Glorious Departure of John Viscount Kenmure (generally attributed to Rutherford), in its entirety (free PDF download)
 Exercitationes Apologeticæ pro Divina Gratia (Apologetic Exercises for Divine Grace), in its entirety (free PDF download)
 Example of Rutherford's literary phraseology in verse form
 Samuel Rutherford: A Study Biographical and somewhat Critical, in the History of the Scottish Covenant, by Robert Gilmour, in its entirety (free PDF download)

Scottish Calvinist and Reformed theologians
Scottish Commissioners at the Westminster Assembly
Scottish evangelicals
1600s births
1661 deaths

Year of birth uncertain
Covenanters
Principals of the University of St Andrews
People from the Scottish Borders
People educated at Jedburgh Grammar School
Alumni of the University of Edinburgh
Academics of the University of Edinburgh
17th-century Ministers of the Church of Scotland
Academics of the University of St Andrews
17th-century Calvinist and Reformed theologians